Javaid Allouddin Sajid is a Pakistani politician who was a Member of the Provincial Assembly of the Punjab, from 2002 to May 2018 and from August 2018 to January 2023.

Early life and education
He was born on 27 March 1965 in Okara District.

He graduated from University of the Punjab in 1990 and has a degree of Bachelor of Arts.

Political career

He was elected to the Provincial Assembly of the Punjab as a candidate of Pakistan Muslim League (Q) (PML-Q) from Constituency PP-186 (Okara-II) in 2002 Pakistani general election. He received 26,720 votes and defeated Sardar Moin Aslam Moakkal, an independent candidate.

He was re-elected to the Provincial Assembly of the Punjab as a candidate of Pakistan Peoples Party (PPP) from Constituency PP-186 (Okara-II) in 2008 Pakistani general election. He received 38,918 votes and defeated Azhar Mahmood Chaudhary, a candidate of PML-Q.

He was re-elected to the Provincial Assembly of the Punjab as a candidate of Pakistan Muslim League (N) (PML-N) from Constituency PP-186 (Okara-II) in 2013 Pakistani general election. He received 38,178 votes and defeated Rao Muhammad Qaisar Khan, a candidate of PPP.

He was re-elected to Provincial Assembly of the Punjab as a candidate of PML-N from Constituency PP-183 (Okara-I) in 2018 Pakistani general election.

References

Living people
Punjab MPAs 2013–2018
1965 births
Pakistan Muslim League (N) MPAs (Punjab)
Punjab MPAs 2008–2013
Punjab MPAs 2002–2007
Punjab MPAs 2018–2023